Scarlett Rebeca O'Phelan Godoy (Lima, April 27, 1951) is a Peruvian historian and university professor. Her research focuses on the Peruvian emancipation process, which begins in the 18th century and goes up to the first 35 years of the 19th century. As a professor, she covers the 19th century, as well as the 20th century up to the period of Fujimori's government. She deals with Chinese, Japanese, Jewish, Arab, German, German, and Italian immigration, as well as other topics. In 2008–09, she held the Simón Bolívar Chair in Latin American Studies.

Early life and education
Her parents are Rafael O'Phelan and Rebeca Godoy. She attended school at Colegio María Alvarado (Lima High School). She completed her higher education at the Pontifical Catholic University of Peru (PUCP), where she graduated with a bachelor's degree in humanities with a major in history with the thesis,  (1976). She taught at PUCP as head of internships (1973-1976). In 1977, she earned a bachelor's degree at PUCP in History).

She pursued doctoral studies at Birkbeck, University of London (1982) and post-doctoral studies at the University of Cologne, Germany (1983-1985) and at the Spanish National Research Council,  (1991-1993). Her doctorate (Ph.D.) was obtained with her thesis, Rebellions and Revolts in Eighteenth Century Peru and Upper Peru (1982), published six years later in Spanish as Un siglo de rebeliones anticoloniales. Peru and Bolivia 1700-1783 (1988).

Career
After a period of work as a researcher for various institutes in Peru and other countries, she returned to teaching at PUCP as a contract professor of history (1985-1988). She then became a regular professor of the Master's program in History at the PUCP Graduate School (1988-1997).

She is currently a professor in history in the Department of Humanities at PUCP.

She has been awarded several fellowships, including: Ford Foundation doctoral fellowship (1977-1979), Central Research Fund of the University of London (1978, 1980), Latin American Research Fellowship (London, 1980–1981), British Academy Award in Humanities (1981-1982), Alexander von Humboldt Stiftung (1983-1985), Social Science Research Council (New York, 1985–1986), John Simon Guggenheim Fellowship (1989-1990), and Maison des Sciences de L'Homme Research Fellowship (Paris, 1991).

She served as editorial advisor of the German Jahrbuch für Geschichte (1983-1984).

She has written several books as well as numerous articles for specialized magazines.

Selected works

Books

 El carácter de las revueltas campesinas del siglo XVIII en el norte del Virreinato peruano (1978)
 Rebellions and Revolts in Eighteenth Century Peru and Upper Peru (Colonia, 1985), traducido al castellano como Un siglo de rebeliones anticoloniales. Perú y Bolivia 1700-1783 (Cuzco, 1988; Lima, 2012)
 La gran rebelión de los Andes: de Túpac Amaru a Túpac Catari (Cuzco, 1995) 
 Kurakas sin sucesiones. Del cacique al alcalde de indios (Cuzco, 1997)
 El norte en la historia regional (Lima, 1998), compiladora junto a Yves Saint-Geours 
 El Perú en el siglo XVIII. La era borbónica (Lima, 1999; 2015), compiladora. 
 La Independencia del Peru. De los Borbones a Bolívar (Lima, 2001), compiladora.
 Historia de la familia en el Virreinato del Perú (Lima, 2001).
 Bernardo O'Higgins y su estancia en el Perú (Lima, 2010).
 Perú. Crisis imperial e independencia (Lima, 2013).
 Mestizos Reales en el virreinato del Perú: Indios nobles, caciques y capitanes de mita (Lima, 2013).
 Abascal y la contraindependencia de América del Sur (Lima, 2013). Ed. con G. Lomné.
 Voces americanas en las Cortes de Cádiz: 1810-1814 (Lima, 2014). Ed. con G. Lomné.
 La Independencia en los Andes. Una historia conectada (Lima, 2014).
 Siete Ensayos sobre la Gran Rebelión de los Andes: de Túpac Amaru a Túpac Catari (Lima, 2016).

References

1951 births
Living people
People from Lima
Peruvian historians
Pontifical Catholic University of Peru alumni
Academic staff of the Pontifical Catholic University of Peru